Art Smith may refer to:

Art Smith (actor) (1899–1973), film and television supporting actor
Art Smith (baseball) (1906–1995), American pitcher
Art Smith (chef) (born 1960), personal chef to Oprah Winfrey and cookbook author
Art Smith (ice hockey, born 1906) (1906–1962), National Hockey League player with Toronto and Ottawa
Art Smith (ice hockey, fl. 1952–1956)
Art Smith (jeweler) (1917–1982), Cuban-American modernist jeweler
Art Smith (pilot) (1890–1926), American pilot
Art Smith (American football) (1915–2010), American football and basketball coach
Art Smith, American football player for the 2007 Arizona Rattlers
Art Smith, character in Action

See also
Arthur Smith (disambiguation)